The following highways are numbered 225:

Canada
 Manitoba Provincial Road 225
 Prince Edward Island Route 225
 Quebec Route 225
 Saskatchewan Highway 225
Dendobeno Highway 225

China
 China National Highway 225

Costa Rica
 National Route 225

Japan
 Japan National Route 225

United States
 Colorado Interstate 225
 Alabama State Route 225
 Arkansas Highway 225
 California State Route 225
 Florida State Road 225 (former)
 Georgia State Route 225
 Indiana State Road 225
 Iowa Highway 225 (former)
Kentucky Route 225
 Maine State Route 225
 Maryland Route 225
 Massachusetts Route 225
 Minnesota State Highway 225
 Montana Secondary Highway 225
 Nevada State Route 225
 New Mexico State Road 225
 New York State Route 225
 North Carolina Highway 225
 Ohio State Route 225
 Oregon Route 225
 Pennsylvania Route 225
 South Carolina Highway 225
 Tennessee State Route 225
 Texas State Highway 225
 Utah State Route 225
 Vermont Route 225
 Virginia State Route 225
 Washington State Route 225
 Wyoming Highway 225